Espera is a city located in the province of Cádiz, Spain. According to the 2005 census, the city has a population of 3,909 inhabitants.

Demographics

References

External links 

Espera - Sistema de Información Multiterritorial de Andalucía

Municipalities of the Province of Cádiz